Alphonse-Victor Colas (25 September 1818, Lille - 11 July 1887, Lille) was a French painter and art teacher. He specialized in portraits and religious art.

Life and work 
He was the fifth of seven children born to Jean-Joseph Colas (1779–1858), a tax official, charged with collecting the "contributions directes" in Verlinghem, and his wife, Adélaïde Thérèse née Leprêts (1786–1838).

Four years later, he studied with François Souchon

During his stay in Italy, from 1843 to 1848, he travelled throughout the country, studying the works of the Old Masters. In 1856, he became a Professor of painting in Lille.

In 1850, he married Elodie Joséphine née Holle (1823–1895); daughter of the Chief Notary. They had three sons and two daughters.

He was one of the most notable church painters of his time, fulfilling numerous commissions in the region. A collection of Old Testament scenes are among his works on display at the Palais des Beaux-Arts.

A street in Lille is named after him.

References

Further reading 
 L. Quarré-Reybourbon, Alphonse Colas, peintre d'histoire, 1818-1887, Paris, Plon-Nourrit, 1904 (Listing @ WorldCat)
 Louis Hallez, Discours prononcé sur la tombe de M. Alphonse Colas, le 15 juillet 1887, Hachette, 2019 (reprint)

External links 

1818 births
1887 deaths
19th-century French painters
French male painters
French portrait painters
Religious artists
Artists from Lille
19th-century French male artists